Horst Oldenburg (born 17 October 1939) is a German former racing cyclist. He rode in the 1961 Tour de France.

References

External links
 

1939 births
Living people
German male cyclists
Place of birth missing (living people)
Tour de Suisse stage winners
Sportspeople from West Pomeranian Voivodeship
People from the Province of Pomerania